Matt Saincome is an American businessperson, journalist, and satirist.

Education
Matt Saincome was born in Danville, California in 1991. Following high school he graduated from San Francisco State University with a degree in journalism.

Music
In 2009 he and his brother Ed cofounded the straight edge hardcore band Zero Progress, for which Saincome was the frontman using the stage name of “The Champ” – a satirical character based on typical hardcore frontmen’s macho attitudes. The band folded in 2014, following which Saincome founded the straight edge band PURE. He has also served as a booker for hardcore and punk shows in the San Francisco area.

Writing
Saincome published a zine called Punks! Punks! Punks! between 2009 and 2012, releasing a total of six issues. Ian Mackaye, Henry Rollins, Lars Frederiksen, and several other punk scene figures were interviewed in the zine, which had a print run of about 50 copies an issue. Following his degree in journalism, he worked as a freelancer for Vice and served as the music editor at SF Weekly until 2016. As a freelancer he produced several articles that went viral, including his Weekly piece “Meet the Man Who Had Sex with a Dolphin (and Wrote a Book About It)”. During this time he came up with the idea of creating a career out of what he called “punk comedy journalism”.

The Hard Times

In November 2014 Saincome, his brother Ed Saincome, and Bill Conway used an $800 budget to cofound the satirical website The Hard Times. Since its founding, the site has added live events and a podcast network to its repertoire. The podcast is entitled The Hard Times Podcast, and features Saincome and Conway in discussion and doing interviews. Its work has been described as a “combination of satirical stories that get into the nitty-gritty of punk politics, and spoofs of news stories”. By 2019 the site was receiving about five million views per month. In 2019 the company cofounded a sister site about videogaming called The Hard Drive.

In 2019 Saincome co-authored the book, The Hard Times: The First 40 Years, following which he proceeded with a national book tour. He also cofounded OutVoice, an automated freelancer payment tool. In 2020 The Hard Times was acquired by Project M in a deal that valued the company over $2 million and allowed Saincome to retain ownership of Hard Drive. He also stayed on board at Hard Times in a position focusing on brand vision.

Personal life
Matt Saincome adheres to a straight edge lifestyle.

References

21st-century American journalists
21st-century American musicians
21st-century American writers
American satirists
People from Danville, California
San Francisco State University alumni
American punk rock musicians
American technology company founders
Journalists from California
Living people
American comedy writers
1991 births